Josh Homme is an American singer, songwriter, musician, and record producer who has released 18 studio albums and collaborated with over 25 different artists. He started playing guitar in the 1980s and formed a band with Palm Desert, California schoolmates John Garcia and Brant Bjork, initially under the name Katzenjammer, then Sons of Kyuss, and later shortened to simply Kyuss. The band released an EP called Sons of Kyuss (1990) when Homme was 16 years old, before going on to record four critically acclaimed studio albums and a greatest hits release without breaking through to mainstream success. After the breakup of the band in 1995, Homme considered abandoning his music career, but was persuaded by vocalist Mark Lanegan to join the Screaming Trees on tour as second guitarist.

In August 1997, Homme gathered a few musician friends at recording studio Rancho de la Luna for a weekend of collaborations called "The Desert Sessions". The experiment yielded two albums, Volumes 1 & 2, and Homme would repeat the exercise at the same studio with different musicians on a further four occasions over the next decade.

Also in 1997, Homme formed Queens of the Stone Age with former Kyuss drummer Alfredo Hernández, initially under the name Gamma Ray. In 1998, Queens of the Stone Age released their self-titled debut album, on which Homme performed lead vocals, guitar, and bass guitar. Queens of the Stone Age would adopt a fluid line-up, with dozens of members joining and leaving as the band developed while Homme remained the only permanent member. They have released several EPs, compilations, a DVD, and a total of seven studio albums, including the break-through Songs for the Deaf (2002).

Eagles of Death Metal started out as an impromptu collaboration on the Desert Sessions' 1998 release Volume 4: Hard Walls and Little Trips, but became a full-time band with the recording and release of their debut album, Peace, Love, Death Metal, in 2004. The original line-up included Homme on drums and his childhood friend Jesse Hughes on lead vocals and guitar, although Homme rarely tours with the band due to his commitments with Queens of the Stone Age. In 2006, Eagles of Death Metal released its second studio album, Death by Sexy, which became their first album to chart on the Billboard 200. The band has since released a further two albums.

In 2009, Homme appeared alongside Dave Grohl and John Paul Jones in the band Them Crooked Vultures. The band has so far put out one record, the self-titled Them Crooked Vultures. Plans for a follow up in the future continue, with Homme and Grohl both continuing to state their commitment to the band despite their numerous other projects.

Homme has also appeared on the releases of several other bands, including Deep in the Hole (2001) and Flak 'n' Flight (2003) by  Masters of Reality, Cocaine Rodeo (2000) and A Drug Problem That Never Existed (2003) by Mondo Generator, In Your Honor by Foo Fighters (2005), and Impeach My Bush by Peaches (2006).

Writing and performance

Production credits

Remixes

Contributions and guest appearances

References

Rock music discographies
Discographies of American artists